When a Girl's Beautiful is a 1947 musical comedy directed by Frank McDonald from a script by Brenda Weisberg. Actress Joi Lansing made her film debut on this film.

Plot 
An advertising man begins a search for the "perfect woman" for a new perfume campaign. After he makes a composite (nicknamed "Miss Temptation") based on several models, his boss believes the woman is real and requests for the man to go and find her. The girl he finds doesn't want to be a model at all, and further complications ensue.

Cast 
 Adele Jergens - Adele Jordan
 Marc Platt - Johnny Hanley
 Patricia Berry - Ellen Trennis
 Stephen Dunne - Marshall Forrest
 Peggie Castle (credited as Peggy Call) - "Koko" Glayde

References

External links
 

1947 films
Films directed by Frank McDonald
1947 musical comedy films
American musical comedy films
American black-and-white films
1940s American films